The Crown is a historical drama streaming television series created by Peter Morgan for Netflix, and released on 4 November 2016. It portrays the reign of Queen Elizabeth II throughout the decades, changing the cast every two seasons: For the first two, Claire Foy played Queen Elizabeth II, alongside Matt Smith as Prince Philip and Vanessa Kirby as Princess Margaret. For the third and fourth seasons, Olivia Colman takes over as the Queen, Tobias Menzies as Prince Philip, and Helena Bonham Carter as Princess Margaret; also, these seasons introduced the adult Charles, Prince of Wales, played by Josh O'Connor, Diana, Princess of Wales, played by Emma Corrin, and Margaret Thatcher, played by Gillian Anderson. For the final two seasons, Imelda Staunton, Jonathan Pryce, Lesley Manville, Dominic West, and Elizabeth Debicki succeeded Colman, Menzies, Bonham Carter, O'Connor, and Corrin respectively.

The Crown has been praised for its acting, directing, writing, cinematography, and production values, and has received many awards and nominations. It won all seven drama categories at the 73rd Primetime Emmy Awards in 2021, becoming the first show to sweep the major drama categories. Before that, the series was nominated three times for Outstanding Drama Series, while also winning Outstanding Supporting Actor in a Drama Series for John Lithgow in 2017 for his portrayal of Winston Churchill and Outstanding Lead Actress in a Drama Series for Claire Foy in 2018. It also won Best Television Series – Drama twice at the 74th Golden Globe Awards and 78th Golden Globe Awards, and Outstanding Performance by an Ensemble in a Drama Series at the 26th Screen Actors Guild Awards and the 27th Screen Actors Guild Awards.

AARP Movies for Grownups Awards
AARP's annual 'Movies for Grownups' awards program honors the movies, actors, actresses, and directors who made last year's best films.

Actors and Actresses Union Awards

American Cinema Editors Eddie Awards

American Film Institute Awards

American Society of Cinematographers Awards

Art Directors Guild Awards
The Art Directors Guild present the ADG Excellence in Production Design Awards for American film, television, and other media with outstanding production design.

Artios Awards
The Artios is awarded to those Casting Society of America (CSA) members who receive primary screen (or program) credit for casting on the winning project.

ASCAP Film and Television Music Awards
The ASCAP Film & TV Awards are given since 1986 and honor (ASCAP) composers, lyricists and publishers of the most performed music from television and top box office movies.

Association of Motion Picture Sound (AMPS) Awards
The AMPS Awards are presented annually for excellence in sound and are gaining increasing significance on the world stage.

Australian Academy of Cinema and Television Arts (AACTA) International Awards
The awards recognise excellence in the film and television industry, both locally and internationally, including the producers, directors, actors, writers, and cinematographers. It is the most prestigious awards ceremony for the Australian film and television industry. They are generally considered to be the Australian counterpart of the Academy Awards for the U.S. and the BAFTA Awards for the U.K.

British Academy Television Awards
The British Academy Television Awards are presented in an award show hosted by the BAFTA. They have been awarded annually since 1955.

British Academy Television Craft Awards
The British Academy Television Craft Awards are accolades presented by the British Academy of Film and Television Arts, established in 2000 as a way to spotlight technical achievements.

British Film Designers Guild Awards
The BFDG Awards celebrate and congratulate the members of the guild and the wealth of talent within the British Art Department.

British Screenwriters Awards
The awards continue to celebrate the very best in screenwriting in UK TV and film, as well as platforming new talent and honouring extraordinary people and contributions to the craft.

British Society of Cinematographers Awards

Broadcasting Press Guild Awards
These recognise outstanding UK programmes and performances seen or heard in the preceding year. All but three of the 16 Awards are voted for by the membership. The rest are decided by specialist panels.

The C21 International Drama Awards
The awards are judged by more than 100 of the world's leading drama commissioners and buyers, making them unique in being The Business on The Business awards for scripted television.

Camerimage Festival Awards

Canadian Cinema Editors Awards

Cinema Audio Society Awards

Costume Designers Guild Awards

Critics' Choice Television Awards
The Critics' Choice Television Awards are presented annually since 2011 by the Broadcast Television Journalists Association. The awards were launched "to enhance access for broadcast journalists covering the television industry".

Dorian Awards
The Society of LGBTQ Entertainment Critics (GALECA) honours its picks for the year's finest in film and television, from mainstream to LGBTQ-focused, via their Dorian Awards—named with a nod to the great and gay wit Oscar Wilde.

Edinburgh International TV Festival Awards

Empire Awards

Environmental Media Association Awards
The EMA Awards honor film and television productions and individuals that increase public awareness of environmental issues and inspire personal action on these issues.

FMF Krakow Film Music Festival Awards

Glamour Awards

Golden Globe Awards
The Golden Globe Award is an accolade bestowed by the members of the Hollywood Foreign Press Association (HFPA), recognizing excellence in film and television, both American and internationally.

Golden Trailer Awards

Guild of Music Supervisors Awards
The UK & European Guild of Music Supervisors is dedicated to raising awareness and understanding of the role of a music supervisor within the entertainment and media industries including film, television, gaming, advertising, trailers, interactive media and theatre.

Hollywood Critics Association Television Awards

Hollywood Make-Up Artists and Hair Stylists Guild Awards

Hollywood Music in Media Awards

Hollywood Professional Association Awards
The HPA Awards are the standard bearer for excellence and innovation in an industry embracing an expanding array of groundbreaking technologies and creativity. Bestowed at a gala celebration each November, the Awards honor creative achievement, outstanding artistry, lifetime achievement, and engineering excellence.

IGN Summer Movie Awards

International Online Cinema Awards

Irish Film and Television Awards
The Irish Film & Television Academy Awards are presented annually by the IFTA to award best in films and television.

Location Managers Guild Awards
The Location Managers Guild Awards are awarded at an annual show honouring outstanding contributions to location scouting in the film and television industries.

Motion Picture Sound Editor Golden Reel Awards
The Motion Picture Sound Editors is honored to host an annual celebration of outstanding achievements in sound editorial via the Golden Reel Awards.

MovieGuide Awards

MTV Movie & TV Awards
The MTV Movie & TV Awards is an annual award show presented by MTV to honor outstanding achievements in films. Founded in 1992, the winners of the awards are decided online by the audience.

National Film Awards UK
The National Film Awards celebrate the achievements of established and independent filmmakers, actors, actresses, casting directors, production companies, and crew who make up the motion picture industry.

National Television Awards UK

Newport Beach Film Festival Awards

Online Film & Television Association Awards

Prémios Fantastic

Primetime Emmy Awards
The Primetime Emmy Awards are given by the Academy of Television Arts & Sciences, an organisation founded in 1946, for television shows broadcast or available for download and streaming in America. The main award ceremony is the Primetime Emmy Award, whilst Creative Arts Emmy Awards are given in technical, creative, and craft categories, and International Emmy Awards are presented to shows airing outside of the US.

Primetime Emmy Awards

Primetime Creative Arts Emmy Awards

Producers Guild of America Awards
The Producers Guild of America have held annual awards to recognize American film, television, and new media since 1990.

Rose d'Or Awards
The Rose d'Or (Golden Rose) is an international awards festival in entertainment broadcasting and programming.

Royal Television Society Awards
The Royal Television Society Awards are the gold standard of achievement in the television community. Each year six awards recognise excellence across the entire range of programme making and broadcasting skills.

Satellite Awards
The Satellite Awards are a set of annual awards given by the International Press Academy.

Screen Actors Guild Awards
The Screen Actors Guild Awards are organized by the Screen Actors Guild‐American Federation of Television and Radio Artists. First awarded in 1995, the awards aim to recognize excellent achievements in film and television.

Set Decorators Society of America Awards

Society of Composers and Lyricists Awards

Televisual Bulldog Awards
The awards range across drama, comedy, factual entertainment, entertainment, documentary, sport and more as well as craft categories including cinematography and music.

Television and Radio Industries Club (TRIC) Awards
The TRIC Awards are awards presented by the Television and Radio Industries Club honouring achievement in television and radio.

Television Critics Association Awards
The TCA Awards are awards presented by the Television Critics Association in recognition of excellence in television.

USC Scripter Awards
The USC Scripter Awards are presented annually by the University of Southern California to recognize the best in film adaptation.

Visual Effects Society Awards
The American Visual Effects Society present the Visual Effects Society Awards to films, television shows, video games, and commercials with outstanding visual effects.

World Soundtrack Awards

Writers Guild of America Awards
The Writers Guild of America Awards are awards for film, television, radio, and video game writing, including both fiction and non-fiction categories given by the Writers Guild of America, East, and Writers Guild of America, West, since 1949.

References

Awards
Crown